refers to multiple fictional characters in the Tekken series of 3D fighting games. The character is an android, first introduced under the name "Jack", in the original video game Tekken. Subsequent Tekken games feature an upgraded model with a slightly different name, with the exception of Tekken 4, in which he makes no appearance.

Appearances

In video games
The various Jack models were originally created by the Mishima Zaibatsu and G Corporation for different purposes:
Jack (introduced in Tekken) is the original model, created by Heihachi's Mishima Zaibatsu in order to counter a coup from Kazuya Mishima in the King of Iron Fist Tournament. In-game, the player is one of these machines.
Jack-2 (introduced in Tekken 2) is a direct upgrade of the Jack model, also created by the Mishima Zaibatsu. Once a Jack-2 witnesses a young girl named Jane lose her mother during a battle, he takes it upon himself to look after her, until he is destroyed by Dr. Abel.
Prototype Jack (or P. Jack) (introduced in Tekken) is a prototype created to combat both Jack and Jack-2. After the first King of Iron Fist Tournament, the remains of Prototype Jack are almost destroyed by Jack's combat abilities. His body is later remodeled by Dr. Bosconovitch and goes on to combat Jack-2. P. Jack is seemingly destroyed by Jack-2 in the second tournament. This is the only Jack to appear in more than three games, appearing in the original Tekken, Tekken 2, Tekken Tag Tournament, and the console version of Tekken Tag Tournament 2.
Gun Jack (also known as "Jack-3") (introduced in Tekken 3) is a more advanced prototype, created by Jane in an attempt to revive her friend, Jack-2. She is successful in implanting her Jack-2's memories, including an energy shield inside him. However, as Gun Jack's energy shield ran out of power, it is destroyed by gunfire by the Tekken Force when he and Jane attempt to break into the Mishima Zaibatsu labs. G Corporation rescues her in time and retrieves Gun Jack's body as well.
Jack-4 (introduced in Tekken 5) is an upgrade of Gun Jack, created by G Corporation and the only one in the Jack series that is non-playable. Like P. Jack, this model has a separate personality. Unlike other models in the Jack series, this one is mass-produced to serve as the foot soldiers of the G Corporation. While these never participate in any tournament, they are sent by G Corporation's Nebraska branch to kill Kazuya Mishima after they no longer need him, and the subsequent battle in Hon-Maru almost results in the death of Heihachi Mishima. However Heihachi survived and blasted far away from Hon-Maru, until he recovered from a comatose for days when the fifth tournament was announced. These specific models have a self-destruct device embedded in them, indicated when one of them peels away its face to reveal a countdown. They also appear as enemies in the Scenario Campaign mode in Tekken 6 and a Tekken 5 flashback chapter of Tekken 7. 
Jack-5 (introduced in Tekken 5) is an upgrade of Jack-4, created by Jane during her first time at G Corporation to participate in the King of Iron Fist Tournament 5. Currently upgraded into Jack-6 after Kazuya's take over.
Jack-6 (introduced in Tekken 6) is an upgrade of Jack-5, upgraded from Jack-5 with same model of previous version, with a minor body part upgrade by G Corporation with the mission of destroying the Mishima Zaibatsu in the King of Iron Fist Tournament 6.
Jack-X (introduced in Street Fighter X Tekken) and his official tag partner, Bryan Fury were released on July 31, 2012, as downloadable content. Unlike Jack-5 – 6, this Jack can talk, although it was revealed to be in prototype stage between both of these main Jack series.
Jack-7 (introduced in Tekken 7) is an upgrade version of Jack-6. It finally has a model modification since it was ended with Jack-5, albeit recolored from Jack-6.
Jack-8 (introduced in Tekken 8) is an upgrade version of Jack-7. Aside becoming a sort of finalized version of Gun Jack as well, it is now equipped with both visor, and summonable giant drill/laser cannon-hybrid weapon.

The Jack series robots also appear in Tekken Tag Tournament (Jack-2, Gun Jack, and Prototype Jack) and Tekken Tag Tournament 2 (Jack-6 and Prototype Jack). The player's Jack character (barring original Jack, Prototype Jack, Jack-X and Jack-4) in most series is belonged to Jane.

In-game, the Jacks have traditionally shared a number of their moves with Kuma/Panda and Ganryu. In Tekken 5, however, Namco made a pronounced effort to differentiate all the shared moves between characters: the fighters still have a few similar moves, but their executions are completely different. In Tekken 5, Jack-5 is considered one of the most difficult characters to play. Inversely, in Tekken 6, Jack-6 is considered one of the easiest characters to learn.

In other media
Jack-2 appears in Tekken: The Motion Picture as a main character, with slight modifications to his Tekken 2 storyline. This time, he is in search of a cure for Jane's illness. Jack-6's dossier is briefly seen in the CGI film Tekken: Blood Vengeance when Anna Williams opens a file containing dossiers on various persons of interest. Jack appears as a Spirit in the Nintendo crossover video game Super Smash Bros. Ultimate.

Reception
GameDaily ranked Jack as the 24th top video game robot, stating, "While not the most popular character in the Tekken series, Jack punched its way to become a worthy opponent". Jack was featured on a list of the best video game robots by Now Gamer, placing him second out of 10, and adding "He's like the Terminator, if Drago-era Dolph Lundgren played the Terminator instead of that other guy" and ranking him at number 7. UGO Networks featured him in the article "We Love These Video Game Robots Even Though They Can't Love Back". PopCrunch ranked Jack ninth on their list of the best AI characters in video games.

GamesRadar mentioned him in the "Robots that don't make any sense" article, questioning "Another Jack? Is that a popular robot name?". In GamesRadar article for Street Fighter X Tekken, they stated "Jack-X seems to be one of the newest models in the series, the buff robot sometimes works for the Mishimas, other times he competes to learn something about himself." Complex compared Jack and Yoshimitsu to Seth and Cycloid-Y from the Street Fighter series, predicting the former two would win in a fight. In 2012, Complex also listed Prototype Jack as the 15th coolest robot in video games. Gaming Target listed Jack as the ninth best Tekken character. GameSpy named Jack as one of the "25 Extremely Rough Brawlers" in video gaming, commenting "Featuring massive metal arms that are as big as its entire body, Jack simply and unemotionally crushes the competition."

PlayStation Official Magazine listed Jack as one of "The best PlayStation robots," stating, "the reason we like Jack, all the Jacks, is their simplicity. They are massive and can batter people around the face with swooping mechanized doom fists".

References

Cyborg characters in video games
Fictional androids
Fictional Russian people in video games
Male characters in video games
Robot characters in video games
Tekken characters
Video game characters introduced in 1994

fr:Jack (Tekken)